The Amstrad "286" PC2286 was launched 1989. The 2000 series launched as a professional follow on to the PC1512/1640.

The 2000 series consisted of three models: 2086 (8086), 2286 (80286)  and 2386 (80386DX). The series used a plastic case similar to 1512–1640, but this time the main computer unit had its own power supply unit built in. The machines BIOS setting were battery backed, however unusually this used 4x AA Battery mounted on top of the based unit.

The 2286 came with 3.5" floppy drives as standard, with side port for connecting an external 5 1/4 inch disk drive. The package contained one of a range of monitors. Screen were 12" and 14" in both VGA Mono and VGA Color.

Specifications
Processor: 16-bit Intel 80286 CPU @ 12.5 MHz
Memory: 1 MB/4 MB RAM
Hard Disk: 40 MB
Graphics: VGA adaptor supporting MDA, CGA, Hercules, EGA, MCGA and EVGA
I/O: Serial, parallel, 5.25 inch or 3.5 inch FDD, mouse
Operating system: MS-DOS 4.01, Microsoft Windows 2.1 and Microsoft GW-BASIC

References

External links
Amstrad PC2286 on RetrOldies Vlog

Computer-related introductions in 1989
IBM PC compatibles
Amstrad